The Leif Erikson Awards, sometimes referred to as the Exploration Awards, are awarded annually by the Exploration Museum in Húsavík, Iceland, for achievements in exploration and for work in the field of exploration history. They are awarded in three categories; to an explorer for a lifetime achievement in exploration; to a young explorer under the age of 35 for achievements in exploration; and to a person or an organization that has worked to promote and preserve exploration history.

The awards ceremony takes place annually in Húsavík. The Leif Erikson Awards are the main and final event of the annual Húsavík Explorers Festival. They were first awarded in 2015.

The awards are named for Icelandic explorer Leif Erikson, considered as the first European to land in North America and who, according to the Sagas of Icelanders, established the first Norse settlement at Vinland, tentatively identified with the Norse L'Anse aux Meadows on the northern tip of Newfoundland in modern-day Canada.

The President of Iceland, Guðni Th. Jóhannesson, and his predecessor, President Ólafur Ragnar Grímsson, have both presented the awards.

Scientific Committee 
The winners of the Leif Erikson awards are voted by the members of the Exploration Museum's Scientific Committee. The committee is appointed for one year by the board of the museum, except for the chairperson, who is the winner of the previous year's Exploration History Award.

Recipients 
The 2015 Leif Erikson Awards were announced by the President of Iceland, Ólafur Ragnar Grímsson, on 9 July at the Reykjavík University Auditorium. The 2016 Leif Erikson Awards were announced by the President of Iceland, Guðni Th. Jóhannesson, on 22 October at the Explorers Festival in Húsavík. The 2017 Leif Erikson Awards were presented by BBC World News Anchor Babita Sharma, on 23 September at the Explorers Festival in Húsavík. The 2018 Leif Erikson Awards were presented by Around the world pilot and News Anchor Amelia Rose Earhart, on 23 September at the Explorers Festival in Húsavík. The 2019 Leif Erikson Awards were presented by Exploration Museum founder Orly Orlyson, on 19 October at the Explorers Festival in Húsavík. The 2020 Leif Erikson Awards were presented by Exploration Museum founder Orly Orlyson, on 15 August via a live-stream from the Explorers Festival in Húsavík.

Explorers Festival 
The Leif Erikson Awards are the main event of the annual Húsavík Explorers Festival. The festival was first held in 2015 with events in Húsavík and Reykjavík. The format of the festival took shape in 2016 and has stayed the same since, with the festival consisting of short expeditions and outdoor activities around Húsavík, young explorers workshops, talks by explorers, concerts, film screenings and art exhibitions.

See also 
 The Exploration Museum
 The Astronaut Monument
 List of geography awards

References 

Geography awards
Exploration of the Moon
Icelandic awards
Awards established in 2015
Húsavík
Leif Erikson